Los Andes, founded on July 31, 1791 as Santa Rosa de Los Andes, is a Chilean city and commune located in the province of the same name, in Valparaíso Region ("Fifth Region" of Chile). It lies on the route between Santiago and Chile's primary border crossing with Argentina by way of the summit of the Uspallata Pass in the Andes mountain range.

Demographics
Of these, 55,388 (92%) lived in urban areas and 4,810 (8%) in rural areas. The population grew by 21% (10,451 persons) between the 1992 and 2002 censuses.

Administration
As a municipality, Los Andes is a third-level administrative division of Chile governed by a municipal council, headed by an alcalde who is directly elected every four years. The 2008–2012 alcalde is Mauricio Navarro S.. The council has the following members:
 Marta Yochum G.
 Oscar Araya S.
 Alejandro Tapia C.
 Sergio Montenegro P.
 Ivan Salinas S.
 Julio Lobos L.

Within the electoral divisions of Chile, Los Andes is represented in the Chamber of Deputies by Marco Antonio Núñez (PDC) and Gaspar Rivas (RN) as part of the 11th electoral district, together with San Esteban, Calle Larga, Rinconada, San Felipe, Putaendo, Santa María, Panquehue, Llaillay and Catemu. The commune is represented in the Senate by Ignacio Walker Prieto (PDC) and Lily Pérez San Martín (RN) as part of the 5th senatorial constituency (Valparaíso-Cordillera).

Economy
Los Andes principal economy is based on mining and agriculture, with vineyards and grapes being the principal fruit export.  Copper and other minor minerals production is handled by Codelco Chile. Until 2004, a Peugeot car plant assembled vehicles in Los Andes (Automotora Franco-Chilena). Peugeot's 404, 504, 505, 205 & 206 models were produced from French and Argentine components, being exported to other Latin American markets.

Transport
Los Andes stands at the beginning of the now derelict  metre gauge Transandine Railway, opened in 1910, which once ran to Mendoza in Argentina, providing a link between the  broad gauge line from Valparaiso to Los Andes, operated by the Chilean State Railway, and the  broad gauge line from Mendoza to Buenos Aires operated by the Buenos Aires and Pacific Railway. It is now being reconstructed. Due to the lack of concrete actions to restore this link, the most recent estimations are that the line could be restored around October, 2009. However, as of June 2011, there is no indication of any restorative work underway.

Notable people
 Laura Rodig (1901-1972), painter, sculptor, illustrator, educator

References 

Populated places in Los Andes Province
Communes of Chile
Capitals of Chilean provinces
Populated places established in 1791
1791 establishments in the Spanish Empire